Life of the Party or The Life of the Party may refer to:

Books
 The Life of the Party, a 1956 book by Bennett Cerf
 The Life of the Party, a 1986 book by Maureen Freely
 The Life of the Party: Democratic Prospects in 1988 and Beyond, a 1987 book by Robert Kuttner
 Life of the Party: The Biography of Pamela Digby Churchill Hayward Harriman, a 1994 book by Christopher Ogden
 Life of the Party: A Political Press Tart Bares All, a 2011 memoir by Lisa Baron
 Life of the Party: Stories of a Perpetual Man-Child, a 2014 memoir by Bert Kreischer

Music
 Life of the Party (musical), a 1942 musical
 Life of the Party (album), a 1999 album by The Planet Smashers
 The Life of the Party (album), a 1999 album by Neal McCoy
 "Life of the Party" (Emcee N.I.C.E. song), 2012
 "Life of the Party" (Shawn Mendes song), 2014
 "Life of da Party", a 2007 song by Snoop Dogg
 "The Life of the Party", a song by the Jackson 5 on Dancing Machine
 "Life of the Party", a 2021 song by Kanye West and André 3000
 "Life of the Party", a song by Boys Like Girls from the album Crazy World, 2012

Film and television
 Life of the Party (1920 film), starring Fatty Arbuckle
 The Life of the Party (1930 film), a musical comedy film
 The Life of the Party (1934 film), a 1934 British comedy film
 The Life of the Party (1937 film), starring Joe Penner and Harriet Hilliard
 Life of the Party (2005 film), starring Eion Bailey and Ellen Pompeo
 Life of the Party (2017 film), an Australian independent film
 Life of the Party (2018 film), starring Melissa McCarthy
 "Life of the Party" (Angel), a 2003 episode of the television series Angel
 "The Life of the Party" (Frasier), an episode of the television series Frasier
 "Life of the Party" (Agent Carter), an episode of the American television series Agent Carter